Kaushambi Lok Sabha constituency is one of the 80 Lok Sabha (parliamentary) constituencies in Uttar Pradesh state in northern India. This constituency, spread over Kaushambi and Pratapgarh districts came into existence in 2008 as a part of the implementation of delimitation of parliamentary constituencies based on the recommendations of the Delimitation Commission of India constituted in 2002.

Assembly segments
Presently, Kaushambi Lok Sabha constituency comprises five Vidhan Sabha (legislative assembly) segments. These are:

Members of Parliament

Election results

2019 result

2014 result

 #Swing based on addition of performance of BJP and Apna Dal in previous election

2009 result

See also
 Chail Lok Sabha constituency
 List of Constituencies of the Lok Sabha

References

External links
Kaushambi lok sabha  constituency election 2019 result

Lok Sabha constituencies in Uttar Pradesh
Kaushambi district